The Brussels Convention for the Unification of Certain Rules with Respect to Assistance and Salvage at Sea is a treaty on marine salvage that was concluded on 23 September 1910, in Brussels, Belgium.

As of 2013, the convention remains in force in over 70 states. The states that have denounced the convention after accepting it are Canada, Croatia, Denmark, Germany, Iran, Netherlands, New Zealand, Norway, Spain, and Sweden.

The Brussels Convention forms the basis of current international marine salvage law. The Convention was amended by a Protocol issued in Brussels on 27 May 1967. However, the Brussels Convention has been overridden in some countries by the 1989 International Convention on Salvage, which took effect in 1996. Some states that have ratified the 1989 Convention have denounced the 1910 Convention.

See also
United Nations Convention on the Law of the Sea
Marine salvage

References

Shipwreck law
Treaties concluded in 1910
1910 in Belgium
Treaties of Algeria
Treaties of the People's Republic of Angola
Treaties of Antigua and Barbuda
Treaties of Argentina
Treaties of Australia
Treaties of Austria-Hungary
Treaties of the Bahamas
Treaties of Barbados
Treaties of Belgium
Treaties of Belize
Treaties of the First Brazilian Republic
Treaties of Cape Verde
Treaties of the Democratic Republic of the Congo (1964–1971)
Treaties extended to British Hong Kong
Treaties extended to Portuguese Macau
Treaties of Cyprus
Treaties of the Free City of Danzig
Treaties of Dominica
Treaties of the Dominican Republic
Treaties of the Kingdom of Egypt
Treaties of Estonia
Treaties of Fiji
Treaties of Finland
Treaties of the French Third Republic
Treaties of the Gambia
Treaties of the German Empire
Treaties of East Germany
Treaties of Ghana
Treaties of the Kingdom of Greece
Treaties of Grenada
Treaties of Guinea-Bissau
Treaties of Guyana
Treaties of Haiti
Treaties of the Kingdom of Hungary (1920–1946)
Treaties extended to British India
Treaties of the Irish Free State
Treaties of the Kingdom of Italy (1861–1946)
Treaties of Jamaica
Treaties of the Empire of Japan
Treaties of Kenya
Treaties of Kiribati
Treaties of Latvia
Treaties of the Kingdom of Libya
Treaties of Luxembourg
Treaties of the Federation of Malaya
Treaties of Madagascar
Treaties of Mauritius
Treaties of Mexico
Treaties of the People's Republic of Mozambique
Treaties extended to the Dominion of Newfoundland
Treaties of Nigeria
Treaties of Oman
Treaties of Papua New Guinea
Treaties of Paraguay
Treaties of the Second Polish Republic
Treaties of the Portuguese First Republic
Treaties of the Kingdom of Romania
Treaties of the Russian Empire
Treaties of Saint Kitts and Nevis
Treaties of Saint Lucia
Treaties of Saint Vincent and the Grenadines
Treaties of the Solomon Islands
Treaties of São Tomé and Príncipe
Treaties of Seychelles
Treaties of Sierra Leone
Treaties of Singapore
Treaties of Slovenia
Treaties extended to British Somaliland
Treaties extended to British Ceylon
Treaties of Switzerland
Treaties of Syria
Treaties of East Timor
Treaties of Tonga
Treaties of Trinidad and Tobago
Treaties of Turkey
Treaties of Tuvalu
Treaties of the United Kingdom (1801–1922)
Treaties of the United States
Treaties of Uruguay
Treaties of Yugoslavia
Admiralty law treaties
Marine salvage
Treaties extended to Guernsey
Treaties extended to the Isle of Man
Treaties extended to Jersey
Treaties extended to Bermuda
Treaties extended to the Falkland Islands
Treaties extended to Gibraltar
Treaties extended to the British Leeward Islands
Treaties extended to the British Windward Islands
Treaties extended to the Colony of the Bahamas
Treaties extended to the Colony of Barbados
Treaties extended to British Honduras
Treaties extended to British Dominica
Treaties extended to the Gold Coast (British colony)
Treaties extended to the Colony of Fiji
Treaties extended to the Gambia Colony and Protectorate
Treaties extended to British Guiana
Treaties extended to the Colony of Jamaica
Treaties extended to the East Africa Protectorate
Treaties extended to the Gilbert and Ellice Islands
Treaties extended to British Mauritius
Treaties extended to the Southern Nigeria Protectorate
Treaties extended to French Madagascar
Treaties extended to the British Solomon Islands
Treaties extended to the Crown Colony of Seychelles
Treaties extended to the Straits Settlements
Treaties extended to the Crown Colony of Trinidad and Tobago
Treaties extended to Italian Somaliland
Treaties extended to Greenland
Treaties extended to the Faroe Islands
Treaties extended to Norfolk Island
Treaties extended to British Cyprus
Treaties extended to the Federated Malay States
Treaties extended to Portuguese Angola
Treaties extended to Portuguese Cape Verde
Treaties extended to Portuguese India
Treaties extended to Portuguese Guinea
Treaties extended to Portuguese Mozambique
Treaties extended to Portuguese São Tomé and Príncipe
Treaties extended to Portuguese Timor
Treaties extended to the Territory of Papua
Treaties extended to the Territory of New Guinea
1910s in Brussels